The Journal of Education for Sustainable Development is a forum for discussion and dialogues in the emerging field of Education for Sustainable Development (ESD).
The journal is published by SAGE Publications, India in association with the Centre for Environment Education.

The journal is a member of the Committee on Publication Ethics (COPE).

Abstracting and indexing 
Journal of Education for Sustainable Development is abstracted and indexed in:
 ProQuest: International Bibliography of the Social Sciences (IBSS)
 ProQuest Science Journals
 DeepDyve
 Portico
 Dutch-KB
 EBSCO
 OCLC
 ICI
 Sustainable Development
 Illustrata: Natural Science
 Illustrata: Technology Collection
 ProQuest Engineering
 ProQuest Green Technology
 ProQuest Environmental Sciences
 ProQuest Sustainability Science
 Illustrata: Technology
 ProQuest Education
 ProQuest Earth Sciences
 J-Gate

References 

 COPE

External links 
 

SAGE Publishing academic journals
Publications established in 2007
Education journals
Environmental science journals